On 3 September 2021 at 14:40 NZST, eight people were injured in a mass stabbing at the LynnMall Countdown supermarket in New Lynn, Auckland, New Zealand. The attacker, Ahamed Samsudeen, was being followed by police officers, who intervened during the attack and shot and killed him after he charged the officers. He was pronounced dead at the scene. The incident was being treated as terrorism and was "ISIS-inspired" according to Prime Minister Jacinda Ardern. This was the second stabbing in less than four months to occur at a Countdown supermarket, the first being in Dunedin, and the first terrorist attack in New Zealand since the Christchurch mosque shootings in 2019.

Background 
At the time of the incident, the Auckland region was under strict alert level 4 lockdown due to an outbreak of the COVID-19 Delta variant in the city on 17 August 2021. Supermarkets were one of the few businesses allowed to open at this alert level. In addition, supermarkets were limiting the number of people in the store at one time to ensure social distancing.

Terrorism in New Zealand has been relatively uncommon. The last incident, the Christchurch mosque shootings, was carried out in March 2019, where two mosques were attacked during Friday prayers. A subsequent royal commission found that New Zealand's terrorism legislation was inadequate, and Parliament was already debating amendments to the legislation.

Incident 
The attacker was trailed by a police surveillance team together with a separate tactical team from the Special Tactics Group when he left his home in Glen Eden and travelled by train to the Countdown supermarket at LynnMall. The surveillance team had difficulty closely following the man in the supermarket due to the man's paranoia of being followed and social distancing restrictions. He proceeded to shop in the supermarket for 10 minutes without suspicion before the attack.

He used a knife from a shelf in the supermarket to carry out the attack. At least one video of the attack was posted to social media showing shoppers warning others and some attempting to intervene.

Two Special Tactics Group officers following him were alerted to the attack 60–90 seconds after it started, and shot the attacker 60 seconds later after he refused to surrender, killing him.

Victims 
Eight people were injured in the attack. Six victims were taken to hospital, five with stab wounds and one with a dislocated shoulder. Auckland City Hospital received three in critical condition and one in a serious condition. Waitakere Hospital and Middlemore Hospital each received one patient in a moderate condition. One victim received minor injury and self-treated at home. An eighth victim was reported by police on 14 September. There were four female victims aged 29, 43, 60 and 66; and three male victims aged 53, 57 and 77. As of 14 September, five of the victims were recovering at home, while three remained in stable condition at Auckland Hospital.

Attacker 

The perpetrator was identified as Ahamed Aathill Mohamed Samsudeen, a 32-year-old Sri Lankan Moor national who arrived in New Zealand in October 2011. He became of interest to police in 2016 as a supporter of ISIS. Samsudeen was deemed a public safety danger after purchasing large hunting knives on two occasions and owning Islamic State videos. In May 2017, he was detained at Auckland Airport while attempting to leave the country, and was held in custody without bail. He subsequently pleaded guilty to charges of distributing restricted material.

After spending three years in prison, he was released into the community in July 2021.  In May 2021, he had been convicted of possessing propaganda-style material supportive of ISIS and was sentenced to one year of supervision. After release from prison, he was being watched by police and the New Zealand Security Intelligence Service, with up to 30 police monitoring him. At the time of the attack he was still facing charges for assaulting prison officers while in custody.

Responses

Political
Prime Minister Jacinda Ardern and Police Commissioner Andrew Coster held a media briefing at 17:15 on the day of the attack. Auckland Mayor Phil Goff vented frustration that the Prime Minister could not share information about the terrorist to the public due to court-issued suppression orders. He also said it is even harder to deal with this attack while the city is under alert level 4 lockdown.

The Sri Lankan government began its own investigation and offered to cooperate with New Zealand authorities.

On 30 September, the New Zealand House of Representatives passed the Counter-Terrorism Legislation Act 2021, which criminalised   the planning of terror attacks and expanded the powers of police to conduct warrantless searches. The counter-terrorism bill was supported by the governing Labour and opposition National parties but was opposed by the Green, ACT and Māori parties.

Societal
The Federation of Islamic Associations of New Zealand condemned the attack, stating that "terrorists who do such inhumane and vile acts do not belong to any religion... They act out of sheer hate, and they have no place in our country." He also expressed sympathy for the victims and their families as well as bystanders who had witnessed the terror attack.

Samsudeen's family condemned his actions and expressed their love and support for the victims. Sri Lanka's Muslim Council also condemned the attack, calling it a barbaric act of terrorism''.

Supermarkets
Countdown as well as Foodstuffs, which together own the vast majority of supermarkets in New Zealand, removed all sharp knives from sale nationwide as a precautionary measure.

Judicial
The incident has been referred to the Independent Police Conduct Authority and to the coroner for investigation.

Aftermath 
On the evening of the stabbing, the Crown Solicitor applied to the High Court to lift the suppression order concerning the attacker, which was issued in July 2018. The High Court ruled it would allow publication as there was no longer a proper basis for it, but delayed this for 24 hours to give the attacker's family time to be contacted and his lawyers time to give instructions and seek a new name suppression order if they wished.

A North Shore teenager who had already been planning an Islamic terror attack felt inspired by the supermarket stabbing and intended to execute his plan earlier. He was arrested on 8 September, with police finding bomb-making ingredients in his home.

See also
2021 Dunedin supermarket stabbing

References 

2021 Countdown stabbing
2021 crimes in New Zealand
Attacks on supermarkets
2021 Countdown stabbing
Islamic terrorist incidents in 2021
Mass stabbings
September 2021 crimes in Oceania
September 2021 events in New Zealand
Stabbing attacks in 2021
Stabbing attacks in New Zealand
Terrorist incidents in New Zealand in the 2020s
Terrorist incidents involving knife attacks